Mehmet Gündüz Coral (born 11 September 1947) is a Turkish novelist, known for his novels with historical settings. His works, such as Extinct Times of Byzantium (author house/USA 2000) and The Lost Diaries of Constantinople (DK Publishing 2008), are also translated to foreign languages.

Biography 
Coral was born in Izmir, Turkey to middle-class parents. He grew up in Izmir, which is actually the ancient Smyrna, and very much influenced by the historical surroundings of his city and nearby locations like ancient Ephesus, Pergamum, Halicarnassus. Following his spartan boarding school years in private colleges, he went on to study business administration and economics in Aegean University. After graduation, he studied at the University of Amsterdam and The Hague Academy of International Law for post graduate studies.

He lives in Istanbul.

Novels 
Extinct Times of Byzantium (Bizans'ta Kayıp Zaman-1998)
The Lost Diaries of Constantinople (Konstantiniye'nin Yitik Günceleri-1999)
Endless Breeze (Sonsuz Meltem-2000)
The Echo of the Universe (Isikla Yazilsin Sonsuza Adim-2001)
The Ashes of Smyrna (Izmir-13 Eylul 1922–2003)
FLYING within the boundaries of time and thought (Zamanin ve Dusuncenin Sinirlarinda UCARKEN-2003)
Rusty Sun (Paslı Gunes-2005)
Asylum Island (Timarhane Adasi-2006)
Operation Golden Virgin (Meryem Plani-2007)
Love in Alachati (Alacati'da Ask-2009)
Daughter of Time-Yellow Rose of Istanbul (Zamanin Kizi-Istanbul'un Sari Gulu-2010)
The Little Prince-The star that fell to the desert
Memories of old Constantinople
The swans of Lucerne
Bird may die, remember the flight
The diary of the Queen Constantinople
The Maple trees of Yenikoy

Research 
Merchants of Death-International Trade in Arms (Olum Satanlar-2000)
The Bride of Fire (Atesin Gelini-2008)

Awards 
 BAL prize in arts and Literature- 2001
 WORLD BROTHERHOOD UNION MEVLANA SUPREME FOUNDATION Prize in literature - 2010
 IZMIR METROPOLITAN MUNICIPALITY City Culture literary award - 2011

References 

 Tell me a tale of İstanbul, the queen of cities!www.todayszaman.com/.../news-215707-111-tell-me-a-tale-of-istanbul-the-queen-of-cities.html -

SOURCES

www.libreriauniversitaria.it/diari-segreti-costantinopoli.../9788849705942 
buoneletture.wordpress.com/.../i-diari-segreti-di-costantinopoli-corat-mehmet-besa/ -
www.deastore.com/.../l-isola-del-dolore.../9788846920737.html 
www.amazon.com/Extinct-Times-Byzantium.../dp/1587217902 - 
www.hepsiburada.com/...lost-diaries-of-constantinople/productDetails.aspx?... 
edebiyatelestiri.blogspot.com/2006/05/mehmet-coral.html 
www.trpress.com/mehmet-coral-zamanin-kizi-kitabi/ 
www.tulumba.com/storeItemSrc.asp?...Mehmet%20Coral...Mehmet%20Coral 
www.dogankitap.com.tr/yazar.asp?id=64

www.kedros.gr 
 Ιστορίες μιας χαμένης εποχής

Έτος έκδοσης: 2002   ΤΖΟΡΑΛ, ΜΕΧΜΕΤ   €14.14

 Τα χαμένα ημερολόγια της πόλης

Έτος έκδοσης: 2005   ΤΖΟΡΑΛ, ΜΕΧΜΕΤ   €12.11

 Πολλές ζωές στη Σμύρνη

Έτος έκδοσης: 2006   ΤΖΟΡΑΛ, ΜΕΧΜΕΤ   €14.14

External links 
Rusty sun- A TV interview with Coral
Love in Alachati- A definitive analysis of Mehmet Coral's literary works

1947 births
Living people
People from İzmir
Turkish writers
Bornova Anadolu Lisesi alumni